Charles Henry Schwarz (November 17, 1825 – October 11, 1903) founded the first Schwarz family toy store in Baltimore, MD called the Schwarz Toy Bazaar.  Later, the Toy Bazaar, along with the other brothers' stores, assimilated into FAO Schwarz.  Charles was born in Erfurt, Germany and was the first of the Schwarz brothers to immigrate to Baltimore, MD in 1840. Charles Henry Schwarz died of pneumonia at his house on October 11, 1903.

References

External links

1825 births
1903 deaths
Businesspeople from Baltimore
German emigrants to the United States
American businesspeople in retailing
19th-century American businesspeople